Galați (also known by other alternative names) is the capital city of Galați County in the historical region of Western Moldavia, in eastern Romania. Galați is a port town on the Danube River. According to the 2021 census it is the 8th most populous city in Romania. Galați is an economic centre based around the port of Galați, the naval shipyard, and the largest steel factory in Romania, Galați steel works.

Etymology and names
The name Galați is derived from the Cuman word . This word is ultimately borrowed from the Persian word  , "fortress". Other etymologies have been suggested, such as the Serbian . However, the galat root appears in nearby toponyms, some of which show clearly a Cuman origin, for example Gălățui Lake, which has the typical Cuman -ui suffix for "water". Another toponym in the region is Galicia, with its town of Halych, locally associated with the jackdaw (Kawka, Halka). Before the Mongol invasion of Rus, Galați was known as Malyi Halych (Little Halych) as part of the Kingdom of Galicia–Volhynia.<ref>Paliy, O. Halychyna from sea to sea or Where have 'vuiky' came from. Ukrayinska Pravda. 28 February 2013</ref> Other similar place names are Galich, Russia and Galatia in Turkey. 

History

Ancient origins
Archeological evidence points to occupation of the region in the neolithic period. For example, north west of the town of Galați, on the eastern shores of the Malina marshes, fragments of ceramic-type Stoicani Aldeni, stilex and tools made of bone have been found. A stone sceptre, from the late Bronze Age, belonging to the Coslogeni culture was found on the marshes' southern bank. Galați town itself developed from an ancient Dacian settlement of the sixth and fifth centuries BCE where there was a ford across the Danube river. In 101 to 102 and 105 to 106, the Dacians fought wars against the Romans and the area became part of the Roman empire. A strong Roman fortress was built at Barboși to defend the ford across Danube. From the 300s a Daco-Roman settlement developed at a ford south of the site of the Church of the Virgin.

Medieval period
There is evidence of continuous inhabitation of Galați since the 600s. A treasure hoard consisting of 12 silver coins issued between 613 and 685 was found in a Byzantine tomb near the Church of the Virgin. Western and Byzantine coins from the time of Emperor Michael IV (1034–1041) were also found. At one time , the city became part of the Republic of Genoa Territories and was called "Caladda". In 1445, a document signed by Stephen II of Moldavia mentions Galați. In 1484, Chilia was conquered by Ottomans. Galați township remained Moldova's only port, not only for domestic trade but also for trade with Turkey and Poland. In 1590, the Galați Jewish cemetery was opened.

18th century

Burial of Hetman Mazeppa
The Ukrainian folk hero, Ivan Stepanovich Mazeppa was a Hetman who died on 1709 in Varniţa, Bessarabia, and was buried in Galați.  Hetman Mazeppa was buried in a brick tomb.

Battle of Stănilești
In 1710, Tatars plundered Galați after the Battle of Stănilești.

Russo-Turkish war
In 1775, Russia established a consulate in Galați. However, in 1789, during the Russo-Turkish war of 1787–92, Galați was burned by the armies of the Russian general Mikhail Kamensky.

19th century
In 1812, following the annexation by Russia of half of the principality, including all of the sea shore and almost all of Danube, Galati ended up as the principality's only port.

Due to unrest in this part of Europe, Galați port became a site for the construction of large warships. Abbot Boskov, a Romanian traveller, stated:
"I saw a large boat, the way those who say Turks caravels, which is on site, ready to be launched into the water. He was commissioned by Isaac-aga, big tax collector of Constantinople. The ship was huge, seventeen seventy steps, and loaded with eighty-four bronze cannons."

Massacre of 1821
In the Greek–Turkish war of 1821, Ottoman subjects were killed in Galați (and in other towns). This was the result of a series of rebellions by members of the port workers' association and city clerks.  

Growth through trade
Despite the wars and unrest, Galați developed based on trade (especially grain exports). In 1805, France and England established vice-consulates. In 1832, the School of the Holy Archangels Michael and Gabriel is founded. Two years later, in 1834, Austrian ships were having scheduled arrivals and in 1837, Galați was declared a free port (this was revoked in 1882). In 1850, James Buchanan, the U.S. president, sent a vice-consul to Galați and the U.S. opened a consulate in 1858. Galați was also a trading port for German lands. When the Crimean War (1854–1856) finished, Galați became a seat of the Danube European Commission. In 1869, the Mihai Eminescu municipal park opened and by 1870, factories were opening. By, 1908 they numbered 41. On 13 September 1872, the King Charles I railway station and northern city rail tunnel opened. The River station opened shortly after on 24 September 1880. In 1889, the V. A. Urechia library opened.

Growth through unity
After the union of the Romanian principalities in 1859, with Alexandru Ioan Cuza as leader, development in Galați increased. Zeletin wrote,
"The birth of the modern Romanian state must distinguish two main currents – one exuberant but superficial, based on liberal ideas which depart from Paris to Bucharest and Iași. The other is quieter but deep, leaving from London to Galați and Brăila: English is the current capitalist economy." (Romanian Bourgeoisie, Zeletin, Stephen.) 

1900–1947

Between 1900 and the beginning of World War I, Galați continued its trade in grain and timber with sixteen consulates. Galați was part of Covurlui County.

In 1907, social unrest among the peasant classes precipitated intervention by the Romanian army. In 1911, a statue of the poet Mihai Eminescu was erected.

World War I

Galați remained under Romanian control during World War I. Romanian soldiers fought alongside those of Russia against the army of the Central Powers. Galați was bombed by retreating Russian troops in January 1918.

Interwar period
In 1919, a high school for Jewish students opened. A first air race between Galați and Bucharest was held in 1926 following the end of the construction of the Galați Airport. The 1930 Romanian census recorded 100,000 residents in Galați. After Bucharest, Chișinău, Iași and Cernăuți, Galați was Romania's fifth city. In 1938, the Ținutul Dunării de Jos (Lower Danube Land) was established.

World war II
During World War II, Galați was bombed by the Soviet Air Forces and Luftwaffe. The railway station, inaugurated on 13 September 1872, was destroyed as were many other historic buildings and most of the old town. On 27 August 1944, Galați was captured by Soviet troops of the 3rd Ukrainian Front in the course of the Jassy–Kishinev Offensive.

Jewish community
Before World War II Galați hosted 22 synagogues and in 1926, it was the base for the Zionist Revisionist Organization of Romania. Although Galați's Jewish community suffered persecution by the pro-Nazi authorities during World War II, the community was not destroyed in the Holocaust. Since the 1940s the community has gradually diminished through emigration.

Communist period (1947–1989)

Post war rebuilding
After World War II, Galați was rebuilt along communist lines. The town's population was about 80,000. In 1956, a proposal to join Brăila and Galați was made and the building of a speed tram pier was proposed with a Swiss company. The plans never materialized. In 1958, the Galați Airport was abolished. Construction of the Galați steel works began in 1960 and the plant opened in 1966. The population at this time was 151,000. In 1971, the Făurei – Galați railway capacity was increased, and, in 1982, it was electrified.

Mogoșoaia boating tragedy
On September 11, 1989, a Bulgarian ship collided with a cruise ship near Galați. 151 passengers and crew died  (all but sixteen). "Ships crash on Danube" Associated Press. 11 September 1989. Accessed 8 July 2012.

Contemporary period
In 2004, Romania's first information technology park opened in Galați.

2005 flood
On 14 July 2005, Galați was affected by widespread flooding. The Siret river reached record levels and across Romania, the death toll reached 21. In 2010, broken flood barriers caused flooding of the Valley City area of Galați.

Geography

Topography
Galați is located in southeastern Romania. Its coordinates are latitude 45 ° 27 'north and longitude 28 ° 02' east. Galați lies in the southern part of the Moldavian Plateau on the left (west) bank of the Danube river at the junction of the Siret River (west) and the Prut River (east), near Lake Brates. The nearest town is Brăila,  to the south. Galați is built on three geological terraces.
The Danube river is considered the "life-blood" of Galați. After the Prut River joins the Danube, the flow becomes . The Danube river flows have significant seasonal variation. The maximum flows occur in May; . The minimum flows occur during the summer; .

Climate
Under the Köppen climate classification, Galați falls within either a hot-summer humid continental climate (Dfa) if the  isotherm is used or a humid subtropical climate (Cfa) if the  isotherm is used. Galați experiences four distinct seasons.

Summers are very warm with temperatures sometimes exceeding  while winters are cold and dry with temperatures at night sometimes dropping below .

Military importance
Galați is part of the strategic Focșani Gate. The city was also part of the important defensive Focșani–Nămoloasa–Galați line built in the 19th century.

Cityscape

Urban planning
In 2005, Galați ranked in the top two cities in Romania for green space per capita.  Urban planning and maintenance activities are governed by the "Public Administration Public Domain Galați" (SPADP) Ecosal Prest, SC RER Ecological Service SRL, SC Citadine 98 SA. 

Places of interest

Roman camp at Tirighina-Barbosi

From 1959 to 1962, archeological excavations were carried out at the Roman castellum in Barbosi. The site lies north of the Danube, near the mouth of the Siret. A comparison can be made to the fortress at Dinogetia. The archeologists found clear stratigraphy in the excavation. They located the Tirighina Dacian fortress, reinforced by an earthen bank. Finds included Dacian pottery from an import business. Also found was a silver coin dating the Dacian fortress to the first century BCE. A burning layer suggested damage to the fortress by fire.  Also found were coins dating from the rule of Augustus(63 BCE – 14 AD) through to Nero (37AD – 68AD).

Lambrinidi House

The Lambrinidi House is located near the university, at 51 Royal Street. It was built by Lambrinidi Epaminonda, a Greek mill owner. He owned a machine shop to repair ships. The Prince Charles stayed at the house on a visit to Galați, in April 1879. It has served as the seat of the Court of Appeals; the Mihail Kogalniceanu High School and, after the earthquake of November 9, 1940, the city hall.

Robescu House
The  was built about 1896. The architect was Ion Mincu. A Romanian tourist website describes the building: :"Robescu House has an elevated basement, two levels with two turret-balcony on the first floor and another balcony at the ground floor, to the street. The exterior decorations are made in Brancoveanu style, glossy ceramic plates. The glossy ceramic is used to decorate the floral upper register.
Today it serves as the "Children's Palace".

Palace of Navigation (River Station)
The  was designed by Petre Antonescu. It dates to the late 19th century. It is the office of "Maritime Danube Ports Administration" and Navrom, which controls Romania's navigable waterways.

University Palace

The former "Palace of Justice" is a prominent architectural monument in the Galați old town. It was built between 1911 and 1913. Now, it is the University of Galați headquarters.

Lupa Capitolina
Meaning "Capitoline Wolf", this statue was erected in 1995 and reflects Roman influence in Galați.

Administrative Palace
This building was erected in 1904 and 1905 and opened on 27 April 1906. Like Robescu House, it was designed by Ion Mincu. Frederick Storck contributed white marble sculptures of "industry" and "agriculture" at the top of the main façade.  Other features are two bronze flags and a large clock which plays the waltz, "Danube Waves" by Joseph Ivanovich (1845–1902).

Places of worship

Archdiocesan Cathedral of the Lower Danube
Also present was the Bishop of the Lower Danube, . Construction continued from 1906 to 1917. The church has one dome and no side isles. From 1989, restoration work has been underway at the church. This includes cleaning of the 1957 paint work, paving around the cathedral and the construction of the St John Cassian centre, a building for cultural, pastoral and missionary work. At the church's centennial in 2006, the relics of St. Nectarios of Aegina were brought to Galați.

Fortified Monastery of the Holy Virgin

This is the oldest building in Galați. It was consecrated as a place of worship in September 1647 during the reign of Vasile Lupu. The church was dedicated to the Vatopedi Monastery on Mount Athos. It was built from local materials including stone, forest wood, brick and lime, sand from the beaches of the Danube and so on. As well as its typical Romanian church architecture, the monastery has some specific elements of interest such as a bell tower with battlements for observation of the Danube valley and for defense. The tower has two levels and a room to hide assets. There are two ramparts and a door to a balcony. The second floor is fitted with windows and battlements. Another of the church's defences is a reinforced bridge consisting of two parts, one above the nave and one above the altar. The bridge has 28 battlements. The church survived the turbulent periods of Galați's history and was rebuilt and restored in 1829 and again in 1859. From 1953 to 1957, the church was used as a museum. It was restored in the period 1991–1994. There may be a tunnel from the church beneath the Danube.

Bulgarian Church

Construction of the Bulgarian Orthodox Church of Saint Pantaleon began in 1861 under the guidance of Bulgarian National Revival figure Archimandrite Maxim Raykovich (1801–1874) of Dryanovo. However, the lack of funds prolonged the construction works and the church was only consecrated in 1887. The Bulgarian Church of Saint Pantaleon features a Neo-Byzantine design with Slavic influences.

Along with the church, Raykovich also founded a Bulgarian school which occupied an adjacent house. The same house would become a hub for Bulgarian revolutionaries persecuted by the Ottoman authorities. In 1871–72, Bulgaria's national poet Hristo Botev lived in the house during a part of his exile, as a commemorative plaque still reminds.

Raykovich died in Galați in 1874 and was buried in the courtyard of the Bulgarian Church, where his tombstone still stands.

Greek Church
The cornerstone of the Greek Church was laid on 6 August 1866. The church was dedicated to the "Transfiguration" on 17 September 1872 by the Bishop Melchizedek and the Archimandrite Eughenie Xiropotamo. In the nave is a marble plaque with the names of the founders and two marble plates with the names of the founders and major benefactors. The church is a cruciform tower with two bell towers on the west side. Papadopoulos of Adrianople was the artist. There are large icons representing the holy virgin Mary with child, the resurrection, St. Gerasimos, St. Sophia, St. Gregory and St. Basil the great. There are eight stained glass church windows containing the holy apostles Peter, Andrew, Mark, Thomas, Bartholomew and Luke on the northern side and Paul Simon, John, James, Philip, on the southern side.

St. Paraskeva Cathedral
This church is located together with the Cătușa cemetery in the southern part of Galați. Its general construction was completed but the interior layout is not. The basement of the cathedral is a very small space, which will serve as a mortuary chapel. The official opening of the interior was planned for 2012.

Church Mavromol
Mavromol is a former monastery. Its name means "black rock" in Greek. It was built in 1669 and dedicated to the Assumption by George Ducas (died 1685) and his son. There was rebuilding between 1700 and 1703. During the revolution of 1821 the church was burned by the Turks. The current building dates from 1858 to 1861 and respects the original plan. Interior murals and other valuable elements were restored between 1973 and 1975.
The monks of the church taught at Galați's first school in 1765. They taught in Greek. (In 1803, teaching was conducted in Romanian under the orders of Constantin Moruz). During the Russo-Turkish War (1768–1774), and the Russo-Austrian-Turkish War (1787–1792), Mavromol church was damaged and teaching ceased until 1803.
The church is constructed in the style of a basilica with apses beyond the main walls. The church has a carved wooden icon of the "Virgin Mary" from the church of St. Sava Monastery in Bucharest. The ceiling is composed of three parts separated by double arches. The entrance is on the south side through a door marked by an icon and heraldic symbols: a bull's head and two lions. Also on the south side is the coat of arms of Moldova, carved in a stone medallion. During communist rule, the church, as a sacred place, was improperly appropriated.

The Church of St. Spyridon
Built in 1817, this church has four buttresses, three towers and a dome supported by crossed arches. Although its murals are not maintained, it contains valuable icons.

Synagogue of Galați
There is only one remaining synagogue in Galați (near the Museum of History on Domnească street).

Masonic Temple
The temple was built in 1896 on the site of a synagogue dating from 1806.

Schitul Vovidenia
This church was built in 1790. It is the site of the burial tomb of Smaranda Cuza, the mother of Alexandru Ioan Cuza.
The original church was burned in the unrest of 1821 then renovated in 1851. Above the nave, a dome is supported by arches crossed in the traditional Moldovan style. There is a bell tower above the main dome, a smaller one above the altar and another above the porch added in 1901.

Roman Catholic Church
Galați's Roman Catholic church was built in 1844 and expanded in 1873. It contains objects of artistic as well as sacred value including a high altar made of marble; a painting of "St. John the Baptist preaching"; a "Most Holy Heart" statue of Jesus Christ; Pietà statues and a statue of Saint Francis of Assisi. The church was strengthened and renovated to its current state between 1985 and 1988.

Gardens, parks and recreation areas

Mihai Eminescu Municipal Park
This park was designed in 1869 in honour of Mihai Eminescu, who visited the area, particularly in his later life. some of the trees are from the time of Eminescu. There is a small lake and a place for recitals once used, for example, by military bands. People visit the park to see a statue of Eminescu.

Galați Public Gardens
This park is located near the student complex. It looks over Lake Brates, the railway station and train depot.

C.F.R. (Romanian State Railways) Park
The railway park is located north of the railway, near the railway tunnel, the terminus of railway lines (102 and 104) and a nursing home.

Botanical Garden

The Botanical Garden dominates the left bank of the Danube at Galați. Its southern slope is the site of the Museum of Natural History in Galați. The museum has collections of tropical and subtropical plants (cactuses, euphorbias, palms, crotons, geraniums, begonias, etc.) rosary chic, over 200 varieties of roses, flora and vegetation. There are over 3000 specimens of tree species and shrubs, an oak area with more than 50 examples of birch and conifers, and a replica Japanese garden.

Garboavele Zoo and Reserve
Both are located at the northern exit of town. Garboavele Forest Zoo is included in the Natural Sciences Museum Complex. The zoo keeps various exotic species. Riding enthusiasts can practice their sport at the zoo. The zoo theme was developed together with experts from European Association of Zoos and Aquaria, and aims to preserve rare animals and provide conservation education.

Hunters Lake
Hunters Lake is located in Galați's far north-east. It covers 28 hectares of land including an 11 hectare natural lake; a 10 hectare forest of acacia; and 10 hectares of developed parkland for recreation.

Danube leisure complex
This park is located outside Galați proper on the road to Brăila. The complex has three swimming pools, houses, camping sites and a restaurant. There is also a western club that is equipped with a pool, restaurant, bar and cafe.

Waterfront
The waterfront is a green recreational area for walking, sports competitions and recitals. Boats moored on the shores of the Danube are converted into restaurants. Also, there are many original iron relics and a statue of Nicolae Balcescu.

Danube Waves Beach
The beach is located in south-west Galați. Popular in the summer, it has two large pools and three smaller pools for children, each with a slide. There is a beach, some restaurants and shower facilities.

Brateș beach
This is a private beach with clean sand situated on the left bank of Lake Brates. Nearby is the Galați–Bereștiul Barlad railway line.

Neighborhoods

 Port
 Centru
 Gară
 Parc Rizer
 Campus Universitar
 Mazepa 1
 Mazepa 2
 Țiglina 1
 Țiglina 2
 Țiglina 3 (Micro 16)
 Țiglina 4 (Micro 17 and Micro 18)
 Bariera Traian
 Traian Nord

 Barboși
 I.C. Frimu
 Siderurgiștilor Est
 Siderurgiștilor Vest
 Danube
 Micro 13a
 Micro 13b
 Micro 14
 Micro 19
 Micro 20
 Micro 21

 Patinoar
 Aviației
 Micro 38
 Micro 39a
 Micro 39b
 Micro 39c
 Micro 40
 Filești
 Bădălan
 Lozoveni
 Dimitrie Cantemir

Cultural life

Theatres

Fani Tardini Drama Theatre
This theatre was opened in 1955. It is named after the actress  (1823–1908). The theatre supports a yearly comedy festival, "Festingal".

Nae Leonard National Theatre of Opera and Operetta
Nae Leonard was known locally as "the prince of the operetta". Opened in 1956, the Nae Leonard National Theatre of Opera and Operetta was originally called "The Theatre of Operetta and Variety Art of Galați County".

Gulliver Theatre
The Gulliver Theatre was opened on 1 October 1952. It is devoted to children's theatre such as puppetry, for example.

Museums

Natural Sciences Museum Complex
The Botanical Gardens on the south bank, hosts a  planetarium. There is also an aquarium displaying rare species of the Danube basin and the Mediterranean Sea as well as exotic fish.

Galați History Museum
The museum was inaugurated on 24 January 1939. This was the 80th anniversary of the union of the Romanian principalities. It is housed in the residence of Cuza, Galați's chief magistrate. In 1951, after World War II, scientific activity resumed at the museum. In 1956, some items were donated to the Natural History museum and the museum of art.  The finds from Tirighina-Bărboși are housed in this museum.

Alexandru Ioan Cuza Memorial House
Cuza's former residence houses a retrospective display of his life.

Visual Arts Museum
When the Galați visual arts museum opened in 1967, it was the first contemporary arts museum in Romania. It has halls and outdoor exhibit spaces. There are also spaces for artists' workshops. The heritage section exhibits Romanian art in the second half of the nineteenth and avant-garde art from the twentieth century.

Galați Village Museum
This museum at the entrance to the Garboavele forest has small village buildings to display the traditional Romanian life in the Lower Danube.

House of Collections
This museum has philatelic and numismatic collections. It is situated near the Memorial House of Alexandru Ioan Cuza.

Rivalry with Brăila
Galați has a deep rivalry with neighbouring Brăila. This conflict has a long history and has reached the point of being studied by academics. In fact, a group of Romanian researchers have already published the book Galați - Brăila. Trecut. Actualitate. Perspective ("Galați - Brăila. Past. Present. Perspectives").Galați - Brăila. Trecut. Actualitate. Perspective

Economy

Galați has the largest iron and steel plant in Romania, the Galați steel works, which was state-owned until 2001, now owned by Liberty House Group. It is still commonly referred to as "Sidex", its old name.

Romania's largest shipyard is located in Galați. It benefits from easy access to the Black Sea and from its co-location with the ArcelorMittal Plant.

Galați is also a border checkpoint to Moldova.

Demographics

City proper
As of 2011 census data, 249,432 inhabitants live within the city limits, a decrease from the figure recorded at the 2002 census.

Ethnography
The largest ethnic group in Galați are Romanians (98.54%). The second largest but less than 1% of the total are the Roma (0.78%). In smaller numbers are Lipovans (0.07%),  Greeks (0.07%) and Hungarians (0.09%). Other groups number 0.27% in all.

Metropolitan area

The metropolitan area is proposed to be formed from the cities of Galați and Brăila.

Education

Galați has educational facilities catering to all ages and scholastic levels. School Nr. 24 (Holy Archangels Michael and Gabriel) is the oldest school in the county. It was founded in 1832. In 1896 it was located inside the Mitoc Monastery. On 26 October 1896 the current school building was inaugurated.

The University of Galați, founded in 1974, includes 11 faculties (with two unique faculties in Romania: The Faculty of Naval Architecture and Department of Food Science and Engineering) and 3 colleges.

The "Danubius University" is a private institution with departments in legal, economic and social studies fields.

Galați also hosts several specialized research institutes. Four are unique within Romania: Icepronav (Research and Design Institute for Shipbuilding), Uzinsider Engineering (Institute for Research and Design for flat metal products), the Research Institute of Fish and the Wine Research Station Targu Bujor.

In February 2013, Galați was the host city of the general meeting of the National Student Association, a forum of the Romanian Ministry of Education.

Libraries

 V. A. Urechia Library 
In 1889, the V. A. Urechia Library was founded through the benevolence of Vasile Alexandrescu Urechia. In 1991, the library moved to a new purpose-built site. The library maintains its own local history collection as well as a rare book collection.

LCMHF
This library was established in 1939. It is associated with teacher training and hosts an active literary circle.

Transportation

Public transport
Public transport in Galați is provided by a combination of trams, trolleybuses and buses (all of which are operated by Transurb, an agency of the municipality).

Rail
Galați railway station has straight train services to cities such as Bucharest, Cluj-Napoca, Brașov and Iași all year and in the summer to Constanța.

Road

Galați in popular culture

ExplosionExplosion (1973) is a communist film made entirely in Galați. It is based on a true incident involving a Panamanian vessel, loaded with ammonium nitrate, which threatened to explode and destroy Galați and Brăila.

Dracula
In Bram Stoker's novel Dracula, Galați ("Galatz") is the port at which Count Dracula disembarked from the Czarina Catherine on his way back to Transylvania.

Meta Tempesta
This is a film about tunnels built in the ruins of Tirighina being used to protect Germans in World War II. It was based on a play called The road to Constanta''.

Danube Waves
This is a film made in Bucharest, in the "Film Production Center", Buftea. It was directed by Liviu Ciulei, from a screenplay by Dumitru Munteanu Caraba and Francis. It stars Irina Petrescu, who makes her debut as the wife of a barge driver. Lazarus Vrabie plays an undercover officer. Ciulei is the barge driver. Lucian Pintilie played the part of a German soldier.

Other
Video of Galați is seen in tourist documentaries, documentaries about World War II and clips of Lautars singers.

International relations

Twin towns – Sister cities
Galați has a number of Twin towns and sister cities:

Notable people

Bibliography
 Paul Paltanea, History of Galați, Ed Porto Franco, Galați, 1994
 Neagu Djuvara, between West and East – Romanian Countries in the early modern era, Humanitas, Bucharest, 2007
 Ștefan Zeletin, Romanian bourgeoisie, Bucharest, 1991
 Galați City Hall about the city's geography and history
 Galați Prefecture, the official site
 Manual of Romania, 2008, NeswIn & The Money Channel, No.1

References

External links

  

 
Populated places in Galați County
Localities in Western Moldavia
Populated places on the Danube
Populated places on the Prut
Port cities and towns in Romania
Cities in Romania
Capitals of Romanian counties
Moldova–Romania border crossings
1445 establishments in Europe
Territories of the Republic of Genoa
Shtetls